Madison County may refer to one of twenty counties in the United States, almost all of which are named for James Madison:

Madison County, Alabama
Madison County, Arkansas
Madison County, Florida
Madison County, Georgia
Madison County, Idaho
Madison County, Illinois
Madison County, Indiana
Madison County, Iowa
Madison County, Kentucky, originally Madison County, Virginia (1785–1792)
Madison Parish, Louisiana
Madison County, Mississippi
Madison County, Missouri
Madison County, Montana
Madison County, Nebraska
Madison County, New York
Madison County, North Carolina
Madison County, Ohio
Madison County, Tennessee
Madison County, Texas
Madison County, Virginia (established 1792)

See also
The Bridges of Madison County, book and film set in Madison County, Iowa
Madison County (film), a 2011 film